Jolyon is a male given name, a Medieval spelling variant of Julian, originating in England.

People
Notable people named Jolyon include:

Jolyon Brettingham Smith (1949–2008), British composer, conductor, performer, author, radio presenter and university lecturer.
Jolyon Connell, British journalist.
Jolyon 'Jol' Danzig, one of the founders of Hamer Guitars.
Jolyon Dixon (born 1973), English guitarist.
Jolyon Howorth (born 1945), British scholar of European politics and military policy.
Jolyon Jackson (1948–1985), Irish musician and composer.
Jolyon James, Australian-born actor.
Jolyon Maugham (born 1971), British barrister.
Jolyon Palmer (born 1991), British professional racing driver.
Jolyon Rubinstein, British actor, writer, producer and director.
Jolyon Stern (born 1939), President of the DeWitt Stern Group.
Jolyon Petch (born 1978), New Zealand DJ & Music Producer.

Jolyon Temple, Australian children's author.

Fictional characters
Jolyon Wagg, a character from The Adventures of Tintin comics by Hergé.
Jolyon Forsyte, two characters (known as Old Jolyon and Young Jolyon) from The Forsyte Saga series of novels (and subsequent film adaptations) by John Galsworthy.
Jolyon Till, a character from Destiny 2.

Jolyon as a middle name
Timothy Jolyon Carter (born 1969), English cricketer.
Louis Jolyon West (1924–1999), American psychiatrist and human rights activist.

Alternative spellings
Joleon Lescott (born 1982), English footballer.

References

English masculine given names